Murphy Edward Troy (born May 31, 1989) is a former American volleyball player, a member of the United States men's national volleyball team, NORCECA Champion 2013, gold medalist of Pan-American Cup 2012 and World League 2014.

Personal life
Murphy Troy married his long-time girlfriend Blair Tarnutzer on October 29, 2016 in La Quinta, California.

Troy enjoys visiting his sister Sarah "Sadie" Troy in Virginia, where she has worked as a Historical Interpreter at Thomas Jefferson's Monticello since 2014.

Career

Clubs
In 2014 Troy moved from France to Polish club Lotos Trefl Gdańsk. On April 19, 2015 he achieved Polish Cup, which is first trophy of Lotos Trefl Gdańsk in history of club. He was awarded a title of Best Server of tournament. Then he won with Polish club silver medal of Polish Championship. In May 2015 signed new one-year contract with Lotos Trefl Gdańsk. Troy left Gdańsk in 2016. He announced his retirement on June 1, 2017.

National team
In 2014 American national team, including Troy, won gold medal of the World League.

Sporting achievements

Clubs

National championships
 2014/2015  Polish Cup, with Lotos Trefl Gdańsk
 2014/2015  Polish Championship, with Lotos Trefl Gdańsk
 2015/2016  Polish SuperCup 2015, with Lotos Trefl Gdańsk

National team
 2011  Pan-American Cup
 2012  Pan-American Cup
 2013  NORCECA Championship
 2014  FIVB World League
 2015  NORCECA Champions Cup
 2015  FIVB World League
 2015  FIVB World Cup
 2016  Olympic Games

Individual
 2015 Polish Cup – Best Server
 2014/2015  Plus Liga – Top Scorer

References

External links

PlusLiga player profile

1989 births
Living people
Sportspeople from St. Louis
USC Trojans men's volleyball players
American men's volleyball players
Expatriate volleyball players in Poland
American expatriate sportspeople in Poland
Trefl Gdańsk players
Volleyball players at the 2016 Summer Olympics
Medalists at the 2016 Summer Olympics
Olympic bronze medalists for the United States in volleyball
American expatriate sportspeople in France
American expatriate sportspeople in Italy
American expatriate sportspeople in Russia
Expatriate volleyball players in France
Expatriate volleyball players in Italy
Expatriate volleyball players in Russia